"War Pain" is a song by American rapper Meek Mill featuring Omelly. The track was taken from Meek's second extended play, 4/4 Part 2. "War Pain" was produced by Ben Billions and DannyBoyStyles.

Background
On January 30, 2016, Meek Mill released "War Pain" in response to Drake's "Summer Sixteen".

References

External links

2016 songs
Meek Mill songs
Diss tracks
Songs written by Meek Mill
Songs written by Ben Billions